Prescott Elementary School may refer to:
 Prescott School, Oakland Unified School District, Oakland, California
 Prescott Magnet Cluster School, a Chicago Public School, Chicago, Illinois
 Prescott Elementary School, Dubuque Community School District, Dubuque, Iowa
 Prescott Community School, a former school in the Prescott Community School District, Prescott, Iowa
 C. J. Prescott Elementary School, Norwood Public Schools, Norwood, Massachusetts
 Prescott Elementary School, Lincoln Public Schools, Lincoln, Nebraska
 Prescott Elementary School, Parkrose School District, Portland, Oregon